Catherine Keener is an American actress with an extensive body of film work who has received various awards and nominations, including a Satellite Award and an Independent Spirit Award. Additionally, she has been nominated for two Academy Awards, two Golden Globe Awards, a BAFTA Award, and a Primetime Emmy Award.

Academy Awards
The Academy Awards are a set of awards given by the Academy of Motion Picture Arts and Sciences annually for excellence of cinematic achievements.

British Academy Film Awards
The British Academy Film Award is an annual award show presented by the British Academy of Film and Television Arts.

Golden Globe Awards
The Golden Globe Award is an accolade bestowed by the 93 members of the Hollywood Foreign Press Association (HFPA) recognizing excellence in film and television, both domestic and foreign.

Gotham Awards
Presented by the Independent Filmmaker Project, the Gotham Awards award the best in independent film.

Independent Spirit Awards
The Independent Spirit Awards are presented annually by Film Independent, to award best in the independent film community.

Primetime Emmy Awards
The Primetime Emmy Award is an American award bestowed by the Academy of Television Arts & Sciences (ATAS) in recognition of excellence in American primetime television programming.

Satellite Awards
The Satellite Awards are a set of annual awards given by the International Press Academy.

Saturn Awards
The Saturn Award is an award presented annually by the Academy of Science Fiction, Fantasy and Horror Films; it was initially created to honor science fiction, fantasy, and horror on film, but has since grown to reward other films belonging to genre fiction, as well as on television and home media releases.

Screen Actors Guild Awards
The Screen Actors Guild Awards are organized by the Screen Actors Guild‐American Federation of Television and Radio Artists (SAG-AFTRA). First awarded in 1995, the awards aim to recognize excellent achievements in film and television.

Critics associations and other awards

References

Keener, Catherine